Ribérac is a commune in the Dordogne department in Nouvelle-Aquitaine in southwestern France. The commune is situated by the Dronne River.

History

In response to the 848 Norman plunder of nearby Brantôme, a fort was built near a ford of the Dronne. Around the year 1000, the castle of Ribérac was built on a hill where the current cemetery is. Houses are set up at the foot of the walls, descending towards the valley. After the Wars of Religion, in the late 1500s, the castle was abanonded and was in ruins by the time of the French Revolution.

In 1790, Ribérac became the prefecture of the District of Ribérac. In 1793, the commune of La Faye joined with Ribérac. In 1800 Ribérac became one of the four sub-prefectures of the Dordogne. In 1851, part of the commune moved to the new commune of Saint-Martin-de-Ribérac. 
In 1926, the Arrondissement of Ribérac was disbanded, and Ribérac joined the Arrondissement of Périgueux.

Despite the efforts of local Maquis resistance fighters, the area was occupied by the German army in March 1944.

Geography
Ribérac is on the left bank of the Dronne. To the north, the soil in the Dronne valley is covered with alluvium, while the heights are made up of Cretaceous limestones. Its minimum altitude, 54 meters, is located in the extreme north-west of the town, where a small arm of the Dronne leaves the town.

The climate is classified as “altered oceanic”, a transition zone between oceanic, mountain and semi-continental climates. With climate change, it is predicted that the average temperature will increase and the average rainfall decline.

Local government
Ribérac is a commune, or municipality. The commune is part of the communauté de communes, (the ).

Since the 2020 municipal election, the municipal council has been led by the Union of the Left.

Population
As of 2017, the number of people aged over 60 (42.1%) was higher than the national (25.5%) and departmental (35.9%) rates. The female population of the town is greater than the male population (55.3%), and higher than the departmental (51.8%) and national (51.6%) rates.

Notable residents
Arnaut Daniel (1180–1200): Occitan troubadour
Fernand Faure (1853–1929): economist and politician
Oscar Bardi de Fourtou (1836-1897): politician
Jean-Pierre Escalettes: (1935-) football player

See also
Communes of the Dordogne department

References

External links

 Discover Ribérac through a photo blogpost 

Communes of Dordogne